Hamden High School is a four-year high school for grades 9 through 12. It is located at 2040 Dixwell Avenue in Hamden, Connecticut. It is part of the Hamden Public School System and is the only public high school within the town of Hamden.

The school was built in 1935 and is still in operation today, although it has gone through numerous renovations. Most recent was the removal of previous additions along with part of the original building, and the addition of 3 additional wings, all of which are attached to the original front wing to form a square.  One of its most notable features is a golden cupola atop a clock tower, at the front of the building.  Below the clock tower sits a small circular window, with two draping plaster banners on the sides seeming to form the letter 'M,' and giving the building the nickname "the MOM building."

As of the 2008-09 school year, the school had roughly 2,500 students. While most students come from the Hamden Middle School, many others come from private and magnet schools in the surrounding area.

Campus
Hamden High School's historic main building was listed on the National Register of Historic Places in December 1994. The school's lobby is decorated with murals showing scenes from Hamden's history. The murals, which form a frieze around the upper perimeter of the lobby walls, were painted by Hamden artist Salvatore DeMaio, a Hamden artist who was awarded the Prix de Rome in 1930, and were completed in 1936.

Arts

Hamden High School is home to an arts department which includes courses in music, theatre and the visual arts.  The visual arts department offers classes in painting, drawing, ceramics, photography and creating art with computers.

Athletics 
Hamden High School competes in the CIAC of Connecticut, within the Southern Connecticut Conference, and class LL. Sports offered are:

Fall:
Badminton (Women)
Cheerleading
Cross-Country
Field-Hockey (Women)
Football
Soccer
Swimming (Women)
Volleyball (Women)

Winter:
Basketball
Cheerleading
Gymnastics
Ice Hockey
Indoor Track & Field
Swimming (Men)

Spring:
Baseball (Men)
Golf (Men)
Lacrosse
Softball (Women)
Tennis
Track & Field

Notable alumni

 Scott Burrell, professional basketball and minor league baseball player
 Joe Castiglione, long time radio announcer for the Boston Red Sox.
 Lawrence DeNardis, U.S. House of Representatives and president of the University of New Haven
 Rich Diana, football player for the Miami Dolphins
 Ed Ellis, professional football player
 Paul Fusco, puppeteer, voice-over artist, and character actor. He is best known as the puppeteer and voice of the title character on the sitcom ALF.
 James J. Greco, CEO and President of Sbarro
 Linda Greenhouse, Pulitzer Prize-winning journalist of The New York Times
Aisha Harris, American writer, editor, and podcaster.
Zakiya Dalila Harris, American author
 Anttaj Hawthorne, professional football player
 Jen Hudak, professional freestyle skier
 Frederick W. Kagan, architect of the Iraq War troop surge of 2007
 Ron Monaco, professional football player
 Bobby Myers, professional football player
 Jonathan Quick, professional hockey player and Stanley Cup champion for the Los Angeles Kings
 Anthony Sagnella, professional football player
 Lori Verderame, fine art and antiques appraiser

See also 
 List of high school football rivalries (less than 100 years old)
 National Register of Historic Places listings in New Haven County, Connecticut

References

External links
 

Buildings and structures in Hamden, Connecticut
Schools in New Haven County, Connecticut
Public high schools in Connecticut
Educational institutions established in 1935
School buildings on the National Register of Historic Places in Connecticut
1935 establishments in Connecticut
National Register of Historic Places in New Haven County, Connecticut